The  were a class of amphibious assault ships of the Imperial Japanese Navy (IJN) and Imperial Japanese Army (IJA), serving during and after World War II. The No.101 class ships were powered by diesel engines, while the similar  were powered by a steam turbine engine. The IJN called them . The No.103 class included the IJA's   variant. This article handles them collectively.

Background

In June 1943, after its defeat in the Guadalcanal Campaign, the IJN realized it needed high-speed military transport vessels, and designed two classes of ship in response.
However, the SS craft were not suitable for mass-production, leading to IJA support for the new amphibious assault ships.
The IJN and IJA therefore cooperated on the production of the new amphibious assault ships with the IJN providing design and shipyards while the IJA offered mineral resources.

Design
The IJN had obtained information regarding Operation Torch from Germany, including some photographs and sketches of the LCT Mk.V.
In August 1943, the Navy Technical Department (Kampon) studied these and finished a basic design. It was a scaled-up model of the LCT.
In September 1943, the Kampon entrusted the detailed design to the Kure Naval Arsenal. The Kure Naval Arsenal completed this within two months, and the No.101 was laid down in November 1943.

Construction
The Kampon designed a new turbine engine for this class. However, it was not ready in time for the first 6 vessels. The Kampon therefore installed the wartime standard diesel engine in the first 6 vessels. The IJN called them No.101 class or SB (D). Turbine engines were available in time for the remaining production, which the IJN designated the No.103 class or SB (T). Completed vessels were split between the IJN and IJA.
The IJA received 32 vessels from the No.103 class, however the IJA had difficulties with the steam turbines engine and returned 10 vessels  to the IJN.
Several No.103 and SB class vessels were converted to use coal-fired boilers in January 1945. Detailed construction records do not exist, but photographic evidence confirms the conversion of No.147, SB No.101 and SB No.108 with the presence of a tall funnel.

Navy service
Most of the Navy vessels took part in the Battle of Leyte, where 18 of them were lost. Most, however, succeeded in landing their tanks and troops.
Only 9 vessels survived the war.

Army service
 As of 2009 a detailed record of the vessels in the Army service is not known to exist in Japan.
 The armaments were not standardized.
 The IJA let ten SB craft participate in the Philippines Campaign. Their actions were limited to the Luzon northern coast, Taiwan and Ryukyu Islands. The IJA lost only one SB craft.
After the Philippines Campaign, the SB craft were used only in the Japanese mainland peripheral sea area.

Ships in classes

No.101 class

No.103 class

Photos

See also
Landing Ship, Tank
Landing Ship Medium
Landing craft tank
Landing Craft Utility
SS-class landing ship
Daihatsu-class landing craft

Footnotes

Bibliography
, History of the Pacific War Vol. 51, "The truth histories of the Imperial Japanese Vessels Part.2", Gakken (Japan), 2005, .
Rekishi Gunzō, History of the Pacific War Vol. 62, "Ships of the Imperial Japanese Forces", Gakken (Japan), January 2008, 
The Maru Special, Japanese Naval Vessels No. 50, "Japanese minesweepers and landing ships", Ushio Shobō (Japan), 1981.
Ships of the World, Special issue Vol. 47, "Auxiliary Vessels of the Imperial Japanese Navy", (Japan), 1997.
Shizuo Fukui, Japanese Naval Vessels Survived, "Their post-war activities and final disposition", Shuppan Kyodosha (Japan), 1961.
Shizuo Fukui, FUKUI SHIZUO COLLECTION "Japanese Naval Vessels 1869–1945", KK Bestsellers (Japan), 1994.

Landing craft
Amphibious warfare vessels of Japan
World War II naval ships of Japan
Ships of the Imperial Japanese Army